Dear My Friends is a South Korean television series starring Go Hyun-jung, Kim Hye-ja, Na Moon-hee, Go Doo-shim, Park Won-sook, Youn Yuh-jung, Joo Hyun, Kim Young-ok and Shin Goo. It aired on cable network tvN on Fridays and Saturdays at 20:30 (KST) for 16 episodes from May 13 to July 2, 2016.

Synopsis
The stories between friends in their golden years of their lives. People who say some words like "It is not the end, we're still alive".

Cast

Main cast
 Go Hyun-jung as Park Wan – age 37, a Japanese translation writer
 Kim Hye-ja as Jo Hee-ja – age 72
 Na Moon-hee as Moon Jeong-ah – age 72, Hee-ja's classmate, Seok-gyun's wife
 Go Doo-shim as Jang Nan-hee – age 63, Park Wan's mother, Hee-ja and Jeong-ah's classmate and successful owner of a jjamppong shop
 Park Won-sook as Lee Young-won – age 63, Nan-hee's classmate, a former actress and advertising model
 Youn Yuh-jung as Oh Choong-nam – age 65, Nan-hee and Young-won's senior
 Joo Hyun as Lee Seong-jae – age 72, a former attorney, Hee-ja and Jeong-ah's school friend
 Kim Young-ok as Oh Ssang-boon – age 86, Nan-hee's mother
 Shin Goo as Kim Seok-gyun – age 75, Jeong-ah's husband

Extended cast
 Jo In-sung as Seo Yeon-ha – age 32, Park Wan's friend, Slovenia resident
 Lee Kwang-soo as Yoo Min-ho – early age 30, Hee-ja's youngest son
  as Gi-ja – age 72
  as Yang Joo-young – Choong-nam's parental nephew
 Byeon Woo-seok as Son Jong-sik – Choong-nam's outside nephew
 Yeom Hye-ran as Soon-young – Jeong-ah's first daughter
 Kwon Hyuk as Oh Se-oh – Jeong-ah's first son-in-law
 Kang Eun-jin as Kim Ho-young – Jeong-ah's second daughter
 Han Jeong-hyun as Soo-young – Jeong-ah's third daughter
 Kim Jeong-hwan as Jang In-bong – Ssang-boon's son, Park Wan's uncle
  as Pal-dal – Nan-hee's jjamppong shop employee
 Jeong Eui-soon as Nan-hee's jjamppong shop employee
 Ji Yi-soo as Sang-sook – Nan-hee's jjamppong shop employee
 Go Bo-gyeol as Ha-neul – Hee-ja's youngest daughter-in-law
 Lee Kwang-soo as Bong-yi – Seok-gyun's elementary school alumni
 Go Jin-myung as security colleague
  as professor Yang
 Kim Tae-hoon as professor Lee

Supporting Cast

 Joo Boo-jin as cathedral congregation member
 Choi Jae-seop as Hee-ja's son
 Jo Seung-yeon as Hee-ja's son
 Park Sung-yeon as Hee-ja's daughter-in-law
 Park Soo-bin as Hee-ja's daughter-in-law
 Kang Moon-kyung
 Yoo Pil-ran
 Kim Pil
 Kim Hak-yim
 Jo Hye-won
 
 
 Kim Hak-sun
 Ok Joo-ri
  as taxi driver
 Noh Nam-seok
 Kwon Jae-hyun as Soon-cheol
 Lee Jeong-goo as priest
 Baek Eun-kyung
 Goo Bon-young
 Kim Yeon-hee
 Shin Shin-beom as Seok-gyun's younger brother
 Kim Mi-ryang as Seok-gyun's sister-in-law
 Kim Jeong-soo
 Jin Seok-chan
 Woo Sang-wook as young Kim Seok-gyun
  as elderly nursing home care helper
 Kwon Hyuk-soo as nursing home care helper
 Kim Ya-ni

Cameo appearances
 Shin Sung-woo as Han Dong-jin – early age 40, a publisher representative, an editor-in-chief
 Sung Dong-il as professor Park
 Jang Hyun-sung as Il-woo – Nan-hee's jjamppong shop regular customer
 Lee Won-jong as Jang Ho-jin – Nan-hee's father
  as Yoo Jeong-cheol – Hee-ja's husband
 Daniel Henney as Mark Smith – Hee-ja's male neighbor, photographer
  as Seo Yeon-hee – Yeon-ha's older sister, Slovenia resident
  as Dae-cheol – Young-won's ex-husband
 Lee Soon-jae
 Kim Ji-young

Original soundtrack

Part 1

Part 2

Part 3

Part 4

Part 5

Ratings
In this table,  represent the lowest ratings and  represent the highest ratings.

Awards and nominations

Remake
A Chinese remake of the same name aired on Hunan TV in 2017.

References

External links
 

Dear My Friends  at Daum 
Production website

TVN (South Korean TV channel) television dramas
Korean-language television shows
2016 South Korean television series debuts
2016 South Korean television series endings
Television shows written by Noh Hee-kyung
Television series by Studio Dragon
South Korean television series remade in other languages